The Saguling Dam is an embankment dam on the headwater of Citarum River in West Java, Indonesia. Construction began in 1983. The reservoir had filled by 1985 and the first generator was operational in 1986. The primary purpose of the dam is hydroelectric power generation but it also provides for water supply and aquaculture. Its power station has 4 x 175 MW Francis turbine generators with an installed capacity of 700 MW. Including land acquisition, the cost of the dam with power plant was about $US 663 million. The installed capacity of the power plant might be expanded to 1,400 MW in the future. The construction of the dam resulted in displacement of nearly 60,000 people.

See also

List of power stations in Indonesia

References

Dams in Indonesia
Hydroelectric power stations in Indonesia
Rock-filled dams
Dams completed in 1987
Reservoirs in Indonesia